Kwatta is a resort in Suriname, located in the Wanica District. Its population at the 2012 census was 14,151.  

Kwatta is named after a former cocoa plantation located here. It used to be an agriculture area, but due to its close proximity of Paramaribo, it is becoming suburban. In the 1838, the Kwattaweg was built connecting Kwatta with Paramaribo.

In the early 21st century, building projects have started in Mattonshoop en Sophia's Lust. The Kwattaweg is the main road in the resort and part of the East-West Link. Kwatta is home to the Gummels Heliport.

Notable people
 Shrinivási (1926-2019), poet.

References

Resorts of Suriname
Populated places in Wanica District